DPZ CoDesign (DPZ) (formerly Duany Plater-Zyberk & Co. and DPZ Partners) is an architecture and town planning firm based in Miami, Florida, founded in 1980 by the husband-and-wife team of Andrés Duany and Elizabeth Plater-Zyberk. The firm advocates for New Urbanist town planning in the United States and other countries, having completed designs for over 300 new and existing communities. In addition to Duany and Plater-Zyberk, DPZ's partners include Galina Tachieva, Marina Khoury, Senen M. A. Antonio and Matthew J. Lambert.

Areas of practice
DPZ's area of practice includes: regional and downtown plans; new towns; urban infill; villages and resort villages; transit-oriented development; suburban retrofits; campuses; housing; affordable housing; and civic buildings. The firm is headquartered in Miami, Florida, with offices in Gaithersburg, Maryland, and Portland, Oregon.

Awards
DPZ has received numerous awards for its projects, including two National AIA Awards; the Thomas Jefferson Award; the Vincent Scully Prize; and two Governor's Urban Design Awards for Excellence.  The firm's early project of Seaside, Florida, was the first authentic new town to be built successfully in the United States in over fifty years. In 1989, Time magazine selected Seaside as one of the 10 "Best of the Decade" achievements in the field of design.

Representative projects
Planned communities designed by DPZ include:

East Beach, Norfolk, Virginia
Village of Providence, Huntsville, Alabama
Alys Beach, Florida
Prospect New Town, Longmont, Colorado

Disaster recovery planning
DPZ took a leading role in the rebuilding of the Gulf Coast after hurricanes Katrina and Rita. Working with the Mississippi Governor's Commission on Recovery, Rebuilding and Renewal, and the Louisiana Recovery Authority, DPZ's designers have generated plans for rebuilding at the regional, local and neighborhood level. They also developed guidelines for individual homeowners looking to rebuild. Notably, DPZ organized and led the Mississippi Renewal Forum, which generated plans for eleven municipalities along the Mississippi Coast; prepared a series of typological plans for recovery and redevelopment of the Southern Louisiana coast under the Louisiana Speaks effort; and participated in the Unified New Orleans Plan as the neighborhood planner for the French Quarter, the Central Business District and Gentilly. Following the earthquake that struck Haiti in 2010, DPZ, working under the banner of The Prince's Foundation for the Built Environment (TPFBE), prepared a recovery plan for Port-au-Prince.

Publications
Andrés Duany and Elizabeth Plater-Zyberk's book Suburban Nation: The Rise of Sprawl and the Decline of the American Dream, written with Jeff Speck and published in 2000, was reported in the national media as "an essential text for our time", and "a major literary event". Their book New Civic Art: Elements of Town Planning, written with Robert Alminana, was published to wide acclaim.  More recent publications by or about DPZ include Duany and Speck's The Smart Growth Manual; Thomas E. Low's Light Imprint Handbook: Integrating Sustainability and Community Design; Galina Tachieva's Sprawl Repair Manual; and Duany's Garden Cities: Theory & Practice of Agrarian Urbanism.

Further reading
 Andrés Duany, Elizabeth Plater-Zyberk, Jeff Speck. Suburban Nation: The Rise of Sprawl and the Decline of the American Dream, North Point Press, 2001  or 
 Andrés Duany, Elizabeth Plater-Zyberk, Robert Alminana. New Civic Art: Elements of Town Planning, Rizzoli International Publications, Inc., 2003. 
 Joanna Lombard. The Architecture of Duany Plater-Zyberk and Company. New York: Rizzoli International Publications, 2005  
 Andrés Duany and Jeff Speck with Mike Lydon. The Smart Growth Manual, McGraw-Hill Professional, 2009.  or 
 Thomas E. Low. Light Imprint Handbook: Integrating Sustainability and Community Design, Civic by Design, 2010.  or 
 Galina Tachieva. Sprawl Repair Manual, Island Press, 2010.  or 
 Andrés Duany, Duany Plater-Zyberk & Company. Garden Cities: Theory & Practice of Agrarian Urbanism, The Prince's Foundation for the Built Environment, 2011.  or

References

External links

New Urbanism
Architecture firms based in Florida
Companies based in Miami
New Classical architects